Bill de Freitas (19 September 1923 – 11 May 1978) was a Guyanese cricketer. He played in one first-class match for British Guiana in 1943/44.

See also
 List of Guyanese representative cricketers

References

External links
 

1923 births
1978 deaths
Guyanese cricketers
Guyana cricketers